Hungaria is a EuroCity train which runs between Budapest Nyugati and Hamburg - Altona, currently running with coaches of MÁV. It is numbered as EC 252-253 and runs daily, mainly with MÁV owned rolling stocks.

History 

Earlier numbering included EC 170-171, EC 174-175, IEx 74/75 and Ex 154/155.

The Hungaria international express train is one of the oldest express trains still in operation. Its first run between Budapest and Berlin via Prague was on 29 May 1960 with a diesel locomotive. It was the first train in the former Czechoslovakia which reached a speed of 130 km/h.

During the 1970s it ran as an express train between the capitals of Hungary and East Germany under train numbers Ex 154/155. Electric locomotives were introduced in this period. The capacity of these locomotives just reached the necessary level.

There were further improvements in the 1980s. MÁV planned to introduce a high level, international rail service with other railway companies of the Eastern Bloc. The Interexpress alliance was founded with the membership of the Czechoslovakian ČSD, Polish PKP, Hungarian and East German DR. The contract was signed in 1986, one year before the establishment of the Western European EuroCity network. In the timetable year of 1986 the Hungaria became an interexpress train with train numbers IEx 74/75. At this time the train terminated in East Berlin, at Berlin-Lichtenberg station, the main railway station of the city. During the next two years it had direct rolling stocks to and from Vienna and in the summer period to Malmö.  During this period and usually on Hungarian territories it used the MÁV V63 locomotives.

The Interexpress network was dissolved after the regime change in Eastern Europe, so Hungaria was operated out of this system’s scope.

EuroCity 

The current system was implemented together with the EuroCity system in 1993. Its termination in Hungary was the Keleti Railway Station in Budapest until this was changed in 2018 alongside all EuroCity trains from this direction - the new terminus is the Nyugati Railway Station. The train has also been extended from Berlin to Hamburg with a total travel time of 13:49 for EC252 and 13:40 for EC253.

As of 2018 the train is pulled by a Class 380 from Budapest to Prague and by Class 193 from Prague to Hamburg. The train has ten carriages: 3 Apmz carriages - first two are first class carriages and the third is the bistro, 1 Bmvz carriage, 4 Bpmz carriages, 1 Bbdpmz carriage and 1 Bpmbdz 294.1 carriage. This arrangement is switched when the train arrives in Prague, due to the placement of the railway lines there requiring the locomotive to change sides (the train has a 25 minute period in the timetable for this purpose). The train has carriages with wi-fi and allows for the transport of bicycles in the Bbdpmz carriage. All carriages are equipped with seats, all of them are able to run in a 200 km/h speed, they are air conditioned and it is possible to reserve a seat for an extra charge.

Current Route

See also
 Vindobona 

 History of rail transport in the Czech Republic
 History of rail transport in Germany
History of rail transport in Hungary

 History of rail transport in Slovakia
 List of EuroCity services
 List of named passenger trains of Europe

References

Notes

Bibliography

External links
 
Timetable of EC 172
Timetable of EC 173
Composition in 1988

EuroCity
International named passenger trains
Named passenger trains of the Czech Republic
Named passenger trains of Germany
Named passenger trains of Hungary
Named passenger trains of Slovakia
Railway services introduced in 1960